A Vorstandsassistent (Board Assistant or Assistant to the Board) is a specific role in German and Austrian public companies that are managed by a Vorstand or executive board.  A Vorstandsassistent typically serves as both a "noise filter" and proxy for the Board Member in a variety of internal and external capacities.  Depending on the board member, there can be one or multiple board assistants (Vorstandsassistenten).  Since each board member has at least one, if not several, board assistants, there is typically an informal network between the board assistants to get work done quickly in big organizations.

Vorstandsassistenten (board assistants) typically serve for a fixed period of time, 2–3 years, and the Vorstandsassistent, by definition, is designed as an executive training program for promising young talent.  The exposure that board assistants gain to senior executives and corporate strategy is very valuable and tends to position the board assistant for high-profile roles in the future.

SAP AG is an example of a company with a broad group of board assistants

Management occupations